Book and Sword, Gratitude and Revenge is a television series adapted from Louis Cha's novel The Book and the Sword. The series was first broadcast on CTV in Taiwan in 2002.

Cast
 Vincent Zhao as Chen Jialuo
 Esther Kwan as Huoqingtong
 Rachel Ngan as Princess Fragrance
 Chen Chao-jung as Qianlong Emperor
 Ray Lui as Wen Tailai
 Vicky Chen as Luo Bing
 Tse Kwan-ho as Yu Yutong
 Leslie Sun as Li Yuanzhi
 Joey Leung as Xu Tianhong
 Kym Ng as Zhou Qi
 Guo Liang as Zhang Zhaozhong
 Xu Lu as Yu Ruyi
 Cheng Pei-pei as Empress Dowager Chongqing
 Zhang Tielin as Yu Wanting
 Yang Guang as Lu Feiqing
 Wu Yue as Zhao Banshan
 Mao Hu as Zhang Jin
 Che Gen as Jiang Sigen
 Feng Pengfei as Xinyan
 Ho Kwai-lam as Li Kexiu
 Deli Ge'er as Muzhuolun
 Zhang Hongming as Huo'ayi
 Lu Yong as Bai Zhen
 Xi Hong as Empress
 Bryan Leung as Yuan Shixiao
 Elvis Tsui as Tuying
 Sui Yongqing as Xuediao
 Sun Changhong as Zhaohui
 Li Qingxiang as Zhou Zhongying
 Jia Yanpeng as Wei Chunhua
 Zhao Xiaozuo as Yang Chengxie
 Guo Qiming as Shi Shuangying
 Wang Xiaohong as Mrs Zhou
 Zhang Wei as Taoist Wuchen
 Guo Changhui as Chang Hezhi
 Jin Ming as Chang Bozhi
 Zhu Yana

External links
 
  Book and Sword, Gratitude and Revenge on Sina.com

Television series set in the Qing dynasty
Works based on The Book and the Sword
2002 Chinese television series debuts
2002 Hong Kong television series debuts
2002 Taiwanese television series debuts
2002 Singaporean television series debuts
Taiwanese wuxia television series
Chinese wuxia television series
Television series by Tangren Media
Singaporean television co-productions
2002 Chinese television series endings
2002 Taiwanese television series endings
2002 Hong Kong television series endings
2002 Singaporean television series endings
Television shows about rebels
Mandarin-language television shows
Television shows based on works by Jin Yong